Of Whales And Woe is the first solo album by Les Claypool, the bassist and vocalist of Primus. The album was released on May 30, 2006.  The album features Skerik (saxophonist of the Les Claypool's Fearless Flying Frog Brigade), Mike Dillon (percussionist, also of the Frog Brigade), and Gabby La La (multi-instrumentalist). "Back off Turkey" also features Les' children, Cage and Lena. The track "Iowan Gal" is a love song for his wife, Chaney Claypool.

Background
Of Whales and Woe marks the first album release under the name Les Claypool. Though previous "solo" efforts were issued under a variety of monikers, these new recordings are the most self-contained to date. On most of the tracks Claypool provides drums and guitar as well as his usual bass and vocals while band members add instrumental variety (Skerik - sax, Mike Dillon - marimba and percussion, Gabby La La - sitar). The CD includes an assortment of musical styles and also includes Les' theme for Seth Green's hit animated show Robot Chicken that airs on Adult Swim.

The song "Phantom Patriot" takes its name from the 2002 incident where a Richard McCaslin infiltrated the secretive Bohemian Grove campground in California.  He was heavily armed and had the words "Phantom Patriot" written on his outfit.

The live band that toured in support of the album was Les Claypool's Fancy Band.

Track listing
"Back Off Turkey" – 2:11
"One Better" – 5:59
"Lust Stings" – 4:08
"Of Whales and Woe" – 3:03
"Vernon the Company Man" – 2:32
"Phantom Patriot" – 4:01
"Iowan Gal" – 3:29
"Nothin' Ventured" – 3:08
"Rumble of the Diesel" – 4:03
"Robot Chicken" – 0:40
"Filipino Ray" – 3:51
"Off-White Guilt" – 2:21

iTunes Bonus Track
"D's Diner (Live)" - 8:05

Personnel
Les Claypool - bass (1-6, 8-12), vocals, percussion (1, 3, 7, 9, 12), guitar (2-4, 6, 8, 9), drums (2-4, 6, 8, 11), bass banjo (7), whamola (10), keyboards (10), drum machine (10), sound effects (10)
Cage Claypool - percussion (1)
Lena Claypool - marimba (1)
Mike Dillon - marimba (2, 12), vibes (4, 6, 8), tabla (5), percussion (12)
Skerik - tenor sax (2, 4, 6, 8, 12), baritone sax (3, 12), horn arrangement (12)
Gabby La La - theremin (4), sitar (5, 11, 12)

Production

Producer: Les Claypool
Engineer: Les Claypool
Mastering: Stephen Marcussen
Design: Zoltron
Layout: Zoltron
Illustrations: Cage Claypool, Lena Claypool
Project Supervisor: Leanne Lajoie

Chart performance

Album

References

External links
http://www.lesclaypool.com

2006 albums
Prawn Song Records albums
Les Claypool albums